Varduhi Varderesyan (19 March 1928 – 24 November, 2015) was an Armenian actress. She repatriated to Armenia in 1946, where she finished the studio of Leninakan Drama Theatere (now Gyumri, Armenia), then worked in the same theater. Since 1958, she has been one of the leading actresses of the Sundukyan Drama Theatre of Yerevan. In 1988, she won the People's Artist of the USSR. In 2002 she was declared an honorary citizen of Yerevan.

Filmography 
1955 - Looking of the Addressee (Hastseatiroj voronumnere) as Arevik
1956 - A Matter of Honour (Patvi hamar) as Margarit Elizbarova
1958 - Mother's Heart (Mor sirte) as Mariam
1959 - A Jump Over the Precipice (as Gayane)
1961 - Northern Rainbow (Hyusisayin tziatzan) as Nune
1962 - Steps (Qayler) (1962) (TV)
1963 - Road to the Stage (Tchanaparh depi krkes) as Maro
1965 - A Sham Informer (as Zaruhi), short
1966 - Mr. Jacques and Others (Msyo Zhake yev urishner) as Zaruhi
1969 - Karine as Lawyer's wife
1970 - Morgan's Relative (Morgani khnamin)(TV) as Magtagh
1972 - Hayrik (as Nvard)
1973 - Adventures of Mher on Vacation (starring)
1973 - Father (Hayrik) as Nvard
1979 - Blue Lion (as a servant)
2002 - The Journey, as Eve's grandmother

References

External links

Persons.am
Biography and photos of Varduhi Varderesyan
Facebook.com

Romanian emigrants to the Soviet Union
Soviet actresses
Armenian film actresses
Actresses from Bucharest
People's Artists of Armenia
People's Artists of the USSR
Romanian people of Armenian descent
Romanian emigrants to Armenia
1928 births
2015 deaths